Karl-Heinz Scherhag (6 February 1936 - 14 February 2015) was a German politician who served in the Bundestag from 1994 to 2002. He was member of the CDU.

Life 

In 1974 Karl-Heinz Scherhag became a member of the General Assembly of the Koblenz Chamber of Crafts. He was its president from 1988 to 2009 (honorary president from 2009 until his death).

Political Career 
Karl-Heinz Scherhag joined the CDU in 1960. He belonged for 16 Years to the City council of Koblenz. At the 2002 German federal election he get a mandate for the Bundestag.
During his tenure, he sat on several committees of the German Bundestag, including the Main and Finance Committee and the Construction and Economic Development Committee.
As a member of the Bundestag, he was heavily involved in the creation of the "Meister-BaFöG" law and the Crafts Code.

Honors 
 Handwerkszeichen in Gold des ZDH (1996)
 Große Bundesverdienstkreuz (2002)
  Ehrenring der HwK Koblenz (2009)

References 

1936 births
2015 deaths
Members of the Bundestag for Rhineland-Palatinate
Members of the Bundestag 1994–1998
Members of the Bundestag 1998–2002
Politicians from Koblenz